Events in the year 1968 in Taiwan, Republic of China. This year is numbered Minguo 57 according to the official Republic of China calendar.

Incumbents
 President – Chiang Kai-shek
 Vice President – Yen Chia-kan
 Premier – Yen Chia-kan
 Vice Premier – Huang Shao-ku

Events

May
 9 May – The establishment of Institute of Nuclear Energy Research in Longtan Township, Taoyuan County.

July
 18 July – The commissioning of Unit 1 of Linkou Power Plant in Taipei County.

September
 1 September – The establishment of Evergreen Marine.
 3 September – The establishment of China Television.

Births
 14 January – Wu Bai, rock singer and songwriter
 6 July – Chen Kuei-jen, manager of Chinese Taipei national football team (2013-2016)
 8 June – Liu Chien-sin, acting Secretary-General to the President (2016–2017)
 13 August – Stephanie Shiao, actress, model, singer and writer
 12 October – Hsu Chen-wei, Magistrate of Hualien County
 21 October – Lee Kang-sheng, actor, film director and screenwriter
 31 October – Kao Su-po, Minister of Mongolian and Tibetan Affairs Commission (2008-2011)
 1 November – Chen Chao-jung, actor

References

 
Years of the 20th century in Taiwan